Komatke (O'odham: Komaḍk) is a census-designated place in Maricopa County, Arizona, United States. The area currently comprising the CDP had a population of 1,013 at the 2020 census, up from 821 at the 2010 census. It is located within the Gila River Indian Community. Its name refers to the Sierra Estrella mountain range, which rises just to the southwest of Komatke.

Geography
Komatke is located at  (33.306204, −112.178107), directly south of Laveen.

Saint John the Baptist Parish Laveen, the Saint Johns Mission, is in Komatke. The name is taken from the mission school founded by the Franciscans in 1894.

Demographics
As of the census of 2000, there were 1,174 people, 241 households, and 218 families residing in Komatke. The racial makeup of Komatke is 1.6% White, 0.1% Black or African American, 93.6% Native American, <0.1% Asian, <0.1% Pacific Islander, and 2.3% from other races, and 2.4% from two or more races. 15.8% of the population were Hispanic of any race.

Education
The K-8 tribal school Gila Crossing Community School, affiliated with the Bureau of Indian Education, is in Komatke.

Transportation
Valley Metro Bus route 51 connects Komatke with Phoenix and Glendale. Gila River Transit connects Komatke with Maricopa Colony.

References 

Gila River Indian Community
Census-designated places in Maricopa County, Arizona